Rik Luyten (11 July 1931 – 7 April 1969) was a Belgian racing cyclist. He rode in the 1958 Tour de France.

References

1931 births
1969 deaths
Belgian male cyclists
Place of birth missing
20th-century Belgian people